Oikos is ancient Greek for "household". It may also refer to:
Oikos (journal), a journal on ecology
Oikos International, a sustainability-oriented student association
Oikos, Cyprus, a village in Cyprus
Oikos University, a Christian school in Oakland, California
Oikos, an alternate name for Kontakion, a Byzantine hymn
, a Japanese legendary strong woman in the Heian period
Oikos/Oykos, a North American brand of Danone yogurt

See also
Oecus
Oeconomus
Oikophobia
Ecology